André Hekking (20 July 186614 December 1925) was a French cellist.

Born in Bordeaux, he studied with Charles Auguste de Bériot, touring Spain at fifteen.  In 1909, he settled in Paris to become a teacher of the cello, having in the meantime gained a reputation throughout Europe as a virtuoso.  He joined the faculty of the Conservatoire de Paris in 1918 and became a professor a year later.  He also taught at the American Conservatory in Fontainebleau.

Among his notable pupils were the cellists Juan Ruiz Casaux, Charles Houdret, and Grace Vamos.

He died in Paris.

Hekking was the cousin of Gérard Hekking and the nephew of Anton Hekking, both cellists.

References
David Ewen, Encyclopedia of Concert Music.  New York; Hill and Wang, 1959.

External links

1866 births
1925 deaths
French classical cellists
French music educators
Cello pedagogues
Musicians from Bordeaux
Academic staff of the Conservatoire de Paris
Chevaliers of the Légion d'honneur